The Pincolini Hotel, at 214 Lake St. in Reno, Nevada was a historic hotel that was built in 1922 and expanded in 1925 and 1930.  Also known as the Mizpah Hotel, it was listed on the National Register of Historic Places in 1984.

The building was destroyed by a fire on October 31, 2006.  Twelve persons perished in the fire, per a historic marker at the site.

See also 
National Register of Historic Places listings in Washoe County, Nevada

References 

Hotel buildings on the National Register of Historic Places in Nevada
Hotel buildings completed in 1922
National Register of Historic Places in Reno, Nevada
Hotels in Reno, Nevada